Clarence Keeley (born May 15, 1936) is a former Canadian football quarterback who played six seasons in the Canadian Football League with the BC Lions and Montreal Alouettes. He played college football at the University of Montana. Earl was the founding coach of the Sherwood Park Rams Football club in 1962.

References

External links
Just Sports Stats
College stats
Fanbase profile

Living people
1936 births
Players of Canadian football from British Columbia
American football quarterbacks
Canadian football quarterbacks
Montana Grizzlies football players
BC Lions players
Montreal Alouettes players
Canadian football people from Vancouver